Roland Urban (29 March 1940 – 26 February 2011) was a Czech luger. He competed at the 1964 Winter Olympics and the 1968 Winter Olympics.

References

External links
 

1940 births
2011 deaths
Czech male lugers
Olympic lugers of Czechoslovakia
Lugers at the 1964 Winter Olympics
Lugers at the 1968 Winter Olympics
Sportspeople from Jablonec nad Nisou